Anne deBlois Smart (b. December 8, 1935) is an American-born librarian and former political figure in Saskatchewan. She represented Saskatoon Centre from 1986 to 1991 in the Legislative Assembly of Saskatchewan as a New Democratic Party (NDP) member.

She was born in Brooklyn, New York and was educated at Smith College, at Queen's University, at Concordia University and at the University of Western Ontario. Smart married Larry Hayes Mullen.

References 

Saskatchewan New Democratic Party MLAs
1935 births
Living people
Women MLAs in Saskatchewan